Kenyon Octavia Coleman (born April 10, 1979) is a former American football defensive end in the National Football League for the Oakland Raiders, Dallas Cowboys, New York Jets, Cleveland Browns and New Orleans Saints. He played college football for UCLA.

Early years
Coleman was born in Fontana, California< to Johnny and Patsy Coleman. He attended Alta Loma High School in Alta Loma, California, where he played football as an offensive and defensive lineman, while helping his teams win two CIF championships.

He earned All-State honors as a sophomore, but his junior season was cut short after fracturing his left leg. As a senior, he was named to the PrepStar All-American team. He also played three years of varsity basketball.

College career
Coleman accepted a football scholarship from the University of California, Los Angeles, where he majored in philosophy. During his college career, he had 138 tackles and 16.5 sacks. He earned All-Pac-10 honorable-mention honors as a true sophomore and second-team All-Pac-10 as a junior. 

In 2000 as a senior, he suffered torn meniscus cartilage in his left knee, playing against Michigan University in the third game of the season. Coleman was granted a medical redshirt, coming back in 2001 as a fifth year senior to earn third-team All-American, All-Pac-10 and winning the Morris Trophy as the conference's top lineman.

Professional career

Oakland Raiders
Coleman was selected by the Oakland Raiders in the fifth round (147th overall) of the 2002 NFL Draft. He made his NFL debut against the Buffalo Bills in week 5. As a rookie, he was declared inactive in 15 regular season games and all 3 playoff contests. 

At the start of his second season, the emergence of other young defensive ends made him expendable in the eyes of Raiders management. He was traded to the Dallas Cowboys on August 31, 2003, in exchange for a 2004 7th round draft choice (#223-Jacques Reeves) and a 2005 6th round pick (#185-Chad Owens).

Dallas Cowboys (first stint)
In 2003, he was a backup defensive end for the Dallas Cowboys, registering 15 tackles (one for loss), one sack, 3 quarterback pressures, one fumble recovery and one pass defensed. The next year, he made 10 tackles, one sack and 2 quarterback pressures. In 2005, he started five of the 12 games he appeared in, posting 17 tackles (one for loss), a half sack and one quarterback pressure.

In 2006, he registered 32 tackles (one for loss), 4 sacks, one quarterback pressure, 4 passes defensed and a forced fumble. He spent four seasons with the Cowboys as a reserve, recording 68 tackles and 6.5 sacks. He played in a 4–3 defense in his first two years, before the Cowboys switched to a 3–4 defense in 2005.

New York Jets
On March 6, 2007 he was signed by the New York Jets as an unrestricted free agent, becoming a starter and leading all NFL defensive ends in tackles with 90. The next year, he made 64 tackles, a half sack and 2 passes defensed.

On April 25, 2009, he was traded to the Cleveland Browns along with Brett Ratliff, Abram Elam, a first round pick (#17-Josh Freeman) and a second round pick (#52-David Veikune), as part of a trade to acquire the fifth overall pick in the 2009 NFL Draft to select Mark Sanchez.

Cleveland Browns
In Cleveland, he was reunited with former New York Jets head coach Eric Mangini and played as the Browns left defensive end starter. He registered 38 tackles, 1.5 sacks and 2 passes defensed. The next year, he recorded 68 tackles, 2.5 sacks and 3 fumble recoveries. He was released on February 9, 2011.

Dallas Cowboys (second stint)
On July 30, 2011, after losing Stephen Bowen in free agency and hiring his former Browns defensive coordinator Rob Ryan, the Cowboys signed him as a free agent to a 2-year contract worth $3.75 million. During his second stint with the Cowboys, he was named the starter at left defensive end, and his physical size and strength was used to improve the team's run defense, starting 15-of-16 games, while making 44 tackles (tenth on the team), one sack, 5 tackles for loss (fifth on the team), 2 passes defensed and 4 quarterback pressures.

In 2012, his season ended early with a torn triceps in his left arm (suffered against the Philadelphia Eagles) that required season-ending surgery, he finished with 5 starts (missed two games with a knee injury), 22 tackles, 2 quarterback pressures and one forced fumble.

New Orleans Saints
On April 1, 2013, Coleman signed a one-year deal with the New Orleans Saints, reuniting him once again with the former Dallas Cowboys' defensive coordinator Rob Ryan. On August 7, the team announced that he suffered a torn pectoral muscle and would miss the entire 2013 season. On August 19, he was placed on the injured reserve list. He announced his retirement on February 21, 2014.

References

External links
Kenyon Coleman player profile from ESPN
Kenyon Coleman profile from UCLA

1979 births
Living people
People from Fontana, California
Players of American football from California
Sportspeople from San Bernardino County, California
American football defensive ends
UCLA Bruins football players
Oakland Raiders players
Dallas Cowboys players
New York Jets players
Cleveland Browns players
New Orleans Saints players